The   was a Japanese reconnaissance aircraft and a light attack bomber of the Second Sino-Japanese War and Pacific War. It began as a fast civilian mail-plane. It was a single-engine, low-wing, cantilever monoplane with a fixed tailwheel undercarriage; it carried a crew of two. It served with both the Imperial Japanese Army and Navy (as the C5M).  During World War II it was code-named "Babs" by the Allies.

Design and development
The Ki-15 was designed by the Mitsubishi corporation to meet an Imperial Japanese Army Air Force requirement of 1935 for a two-seat, high-speed reconnaissance aircraft. The resulting aircraft was a low-wing cantilever monoplane with a fixed, spatted undercarriage, similar to other all-metal stressed-skin monoplanes developed elsewhere in 1930s, such as the Heinkel He 70 and the Northrop Alpha. Power was by a single Nakajima Ha-8 radial engine, giving 560 kW (750 hp) at 4,000 m (13,120 ft). The first prototype flew in May 1936, with testing proving successful, the aircraft meeting all performance requirements, reaching a speed of 481 km/h (299 mph) and showing good handling characteristics.

Service testing was completed without difficulty and the type was ordered into production under the official designation Army Type 97 Command ReconnaissanceAircraft Model 1.  In May 1937, a year after the first flight, delivery of the first of 437 production aircraft to the army began.

Operational history
The Ki-15-I was almost immediately placed into operational service at the beginning of the war with China in 1937. The aircraft proved useful in the early period of the Second Sino-Japanese War and performed missions deep into Chinese strategic rear areas, as far as reaching Lanzhou, and in particular serving as pre-strike guide and post-strike observation during the years-long Battle of Chongqing-Chengdu. Its high speed gave it a distinct advantage until the Chinese Air Force acquired Soviet-made Polikarpov I-16 Type 17 fighters; a Ki-15 was shot down along with three bombers by I-16 Type 17 fighters of the 24th PS, 4th PG over Liangshan Airbase on 20 May 1940. It was used for level bombing, close support and photo reconnaissance before being eventually replaced by the Mitsubishi Ki-30.

Plans were already in hand to improve the Ki-15-I, and in September 1939 the Ki-15-II was put into production with the  Mitsubishi Ha-26-1; the smaller diameter of this both reduced drag and overcame one of the major shortcomings of the initial version: poor forward field of view past the large-diameter of the initial Nakajima Kotobuki engine. The improved version entered production in September 1939 as the Ki-15-II.

The Japanese Navy, impressed by the performance of this aircraft, ordered 20 examples of the Ki-15-II under the designation “Navy Type 98 Reconnaissance Aircraft Model 1," or Mitsubishi designation C5M1, even before the Army. The Navy subsequently acquired 30 C5M2 aircraft which had an even more powerful  Nakajima Sakae 12 engine. They were used for reconnaissance duties. 
In further development, the army also experimented with an even more powerful engine with  Mitsubishi 102 radial in the Ki-15-III which did not enter production.

When production ended, approximately 500 examples of all versions of the Ki-15 had been built, the majority in front-line service when the Pacific War began. By 1943, the Ki-15 had been relegated to second-line roles, but numbers were expended in kamikaze attacks in the closing stages of World War II.

World record flight to Europe and other civilian use

Despite the relatively weak engine (by later standards) and fixed undercarriage, the Ki-15 was remarkably fast. During the initial flight testing, the Asahi newspaper Asahi Shimbun obtained permission to purchase the second prototype. The aircraft was given the designation Karigane (Wild Goose), flying on 19 March 1937, being named Kamikaze and registered as J-BAAI. It was the first Japanese-built airplane to fly to Europe and caused a sensation in 1937 by making the flight between Tokyo and London, for the coronation of King George VI and Queen Elizabeth, between 6 April 1937 and 9 April 1937 in a flight time of 51 hours, 17 minutes and 23 seconds, a world record at the time. Following the success of the Japan-England flight, a small number of Ki-15s were sold to civil customers. One of the early production aircraft was named "Asakaze" (J-BAAL) and was also used by the Asahi Shimbun newspaper; others were used by various civilian operators as mail-planes.

Variants
 Karigane I : Prototype version for civilian use
Ki-15-I (Army Type 97 Command Reconnaissance Aircraft Model 1) : Initial production variant for the Japanese Army, with Nakajima Ha-8 (Army Type 94) 640 hp at take-off, 900 hp at 11,810 ft (3,600 m)
Ki-15-II (Army Type 97 Command Reconnaissance Model 2) : Improved Army production version with smaller, more powerful engine 14-cylinder Mitsubishi Ha-25-I (Army Type 99 Model 1), with 850 hp at take-off, 900 hp at 11,810 ft. This gave an increased maximum speed of 317 mph at 14,205 ft (510 km/h at 4,300 m), roughly comparable with fighters like Hawker Hurricane or the Nakajima Ki-43 Hayabusa. The climb was even more improved: 16,405 ft (5,000 m) in 6 min 49 sec (6,83 min). This was achieved despite the increase in weight (empty, normal, max: 3,510 vs 3,084 lb, normal 4,826 vs 4,482 and max 5,470 vs 5,071 lb). Maiden flight in June 1938, production started in September 1939
Ki-15-III  : Proposed upgraded version, did not enter production version. But this latter was expected to be far better in other ways (endurance, two engine, etc.), so this version never  went in production, even if it was proposed since 1939
C5M1 (Navy Type 98 Reconnaissance Aircraft Model I) : Improved version of Ki-15-I for the Japanese Navy
C5M2 (Navy Type 98 Reconnaissance Aircraft Model 2) : Upgraded version of C5M1 with more powerful engine for the Japanese Navy

Operators

 Imperial Japanese Army Air Force
 Imperial Japanese Navy Air Service
 Various civilian entities, including the Asahi Shimbun

 People's Liberation Army Air Force operated an unknown number of captured aircraft. A number of abandoned Ki-15s were captured near Harbin in June 1946, and by 1948, they were completely repaired and entered service as trainers. The last two Ki-15 retired in 1951.

Specifications (Ki-15-I)

See also

References

Notes

Bibliography

External links

 Daves Warbirds
 Imperial Japanese Aviation Resource Center

Low-wing aircraft
Ki-15, Mitsubishi
Ki-15, Mitsubishi
Ki-15, Mitsubishi
Ki-015
Single-engined tractor aircraft
Aircraft first flown in 1936